Arfiane El Bared (also known as El Arfiane) is a village in the commune of Tendla, in Djamaâ District, El Oued Province, Algeria. The local road W303 leads through the village from the N3 towards Tendla.

References

Neighbouring towns and cities

Populated places in El Oued Province